Sha Kong Wai is a village in Ha Tsuen, Yuen Long District, Hong Kong. Part of it is a historic walled village.

Administration
Sha Kong Wai is a recognized village under the New Territories Small House Policy. It is one of the 37 villages represented within the Ping Shan Rural Committee. For electoral purposes, Sha Kong Wai is part of the Ping Shan North constituency.

History
The village was probably founded in the 17th century, in the late Ming Dynasty.

See also
 Walled villages of Hong Kong

References

Further reading

External links

 Delineation of area of existing village Sha Kong Wai (Ping Shan) for election of resident representative (2019 to 2022)
 Antiquities Advisory Board. Pictures of Chi Hong Po Jai, Sha Kong Wai
 Antiquities Advisory Board. Pictures of Entrance Gate, Sha Kong Wai

Walled villages of Hong Kong
Ha Tsuen
Villages in Yuen Long District, Hong Kong